Hang Tau Tsuen or Hang Tau Village is a village in Sheung Shui, North District, Hong Kong.

Administration
Hang Tau is a recognized village under the New Territories Small House Policy. Hang Tau Tsuen is one of the villages represented within the Sheung Shui District Rural Committee. For electoral purposes, Hang Tau Tsuen is part of the Sheung Shui Rural constituency, which is currently represented by Simon Hau Fuk-tat.

References

External links

 Delineation of area of existing village Hang Tau (Sheung Shui) for election of resident representative (2019 to 2022)

Villages in North District, Hong Kong